Andriy Ihorovych Hitchenko (born 2 October 1984) is a Ukrainian professional footballer who plays as a defender for Polissya Zhytomyr in the Ukrainian First League.

Clubs

Desna Chernihiv 
In 2018 he moved to Desna Chernihiv. There, he helped his club qualify for the quarterfinals of the 2019–20 Ukrainian Cup.

On 12 July 2020 he scored against Shakhtar Donetsk, helping the club qualify for the 2020–21 UEFA Europa League for the first time in club history. On 24 September, Hitchenko was included in the team against VfL Wolfsburg for the Europa League third qualifying round after extending his contract by a year.

On 26 February 2021 he scored his first Ukrainian Premier League goal in a 3–0 victory over Inhulets Petrove.

Polissya Zhytomyr 
After his contract with Desna expired, he moved to Polissya Zhytomyr in Ukrainian First League on 1 July 2021. On 7 August, he scored his first goal for his new club against Kremin.

Career statistics

Club

Honours
Oleksandriya
 Ukrainian First League: 2010–11

Individual
 Best player round 26 Ukrainian Premier League: 2019–20

Gallery

References

External links
Profile on Official website of Polissya Zhytomyr
Profile on Official website of FC Desna Chernihiv
Club profile

1984 births
Living people
Footballers from Kyiv
Ukrainian footballers
FC Arsenal Kyiv players
FC CSKA Kyiv players
FC Oleksandriya players
Ukrainian Premier League players
Ukrainian First League players
FC Desna Chernihiv players
FC Kryvbas Kryvyi Rih players
FC Karpaty Lviv players
FC Polissya Zhytomyr players
Association football defenders